Syllomus is an extinct genus of sea turtle from the Miocene-age deposits in the US Eastern Seaboard and Egypt.

Taxonomy
Two species are known, Syllomus aegyptiacus (Lydekker, 1889) and S. crispatus Cope, 1896. Lapparent de Broin (2001) considers Trachyaspis a possible senior synonym of Syllomus.

References

External links
 Syllomus at the Paleobiology Database

Cheloniidae
Miocene turtles
Extinct animals of the United States
Prehistoric turtle genera
Taxa named by Edward Drinker Cope
Extinct turtles
Turtle genera